Harry Jenkins (born 1952) is an Australian Labor politician.

Harry Jenkins may also refer to:
Harry Jenkins Sr. (1925–2004), Australian Labor politician
Harry Reginald Jenkins (1881–1970), New Zealand Member of Parliament
Harry W. Jenkins, general in the United States Marine Corps

See also
Henry Jenkins (disambiguation)
Harold Jenkins (disambiguation)